Zeilberger may refer to:

 Doron Zeilberger (born 1950), an Israeli mathematician
 Wilf–Zeilberger pair
 Zeilberger-Bressoud theorem
 Johann Zeilberger (1831–1881), Austrian politician
 Rabbi Binyamin Zeilberger

German-language surnames
Jewish surnames
Yiddish-language surnames